This is a list of Members of Parliament elected at the 1929 general election, held on 30 May. For a complete list of constituency elections results, see Constituency election results in the 1929 United Kingdom general election.

By-elections
See the list of United Kingdom by-elections.

1929
General election
 List
UK MPs